A majority of Nigeria's population are Hausa. They are predominantly Muslim, but some are Christians. They speak the Hausa language, although different tribes speak different dialects. Hausa traditional marriage is not as expensive as other forms of marriage in Nigeria. Hausa traditional marriage is based on Islamic or Sharia law.

In this tradition, a man seeks his parents' consent when he finds a woman he intends to marry. After the parents have given their consent, the other marital rites follow suit. These stages include Na Gani Ina so, Sadaki, the wedding or Daura Aure/Shafa Fatiha, and Kai Amariya.

Na Gani Ina so

In the Hausa language, this means "I have found and I love it". This is a stage when the man with his family members goes to the woman's house to make their intention known to her parents. They carry along with them some items such as Kolanuts, bags of salt, sweets and chocolate. If these items were accepted by the bride's parents, that means they have agreed to give out their daughter's hand in marriage to the groom's family. It is now left for the family of the bride to communicate to the groom's family of their approval of the marriage. This process is called "Gaisuwa". Before this they might have done their enquiry concerning the man seeking to marry their daughter to ascertain his moral, religious, and social belief, and to also know his family background. The bride and the groom to be are not allowed to have any physical contact until they are properly married. After this process the couple become engaged and both families start working towards the wedding and setting of date. The process of fixing the wedding date is called "Sa rana"

Sadaki

This is the stage of paying the bride price or dowry. It starts with a minimum amount called "Rubu Dinar" in Hausa, ranging to the highest amount the groom can afford to pay. Islamic teaching teaches that a lesser dowry paid produces a more blessed marriage. The money being paid as bride price is being announced to the hearing of everyone present. The bride price could be money paid in cash or in installments or it could be labor for a Damsel. As for a divorced or a widow, she gets to decide her bride price.

Wedding Fatiha

The wedding date is called the fatiha. Women are not expected to be seen in the wedding fatiha rather they are to be with the bride celebrating her last day as a single and also prepare her for the married life. The bride gets to sit in the midst of her female friends, relax and paint her lovely fingers and feet with henna, and her friends also paint theirs too. The bride in hausa is called "amarya" whereas the groom is called "ango".

At the wedding reception, food and drinks are being served to the guests. In Hausa tradition, it is the duty of the husband to rent an empty house while the responsibility of furnishing it is the responsibility of the bride's family.

Kai Amariya

After the wedding, the bride is being accompanied to her husband's home to be well welcomed by the groom's family. They chant songs on their way and carry all the bride's belongings with them.

References

External link 
 Sadaki

Hausa
Marriage by culture
Marriage by ethnicity
Marriage in Africa